David Alexander Kirkpatrick (August 16, 1870 – July 12, 1939) was a college football player and pioneer brick manufacturer of Greensboro and Reidsville.

University of North Carolina
Kirkpatrick was a prominent guard for the North Carolina Tar Heels football team of the University of North Carolina; known for his size. He was selected for an All-Southern team in 1895.

1892
He was a member of the 1892 team which claims a Southern championship and won three games in four days.

References

External links

1870 births
1939 deaths
North Carolina Tar Heels football players
People from Guilford County, North Carolina
All-Southern college football players
American football guards
19th-century players of American football